The Lala Mustafa Pasha Mosque, originally known as the Cathedral of Saint Nicholas and later as the Saint Sophia (Ayasofya) Mosque of Mağusa, is the largest medieval building in Famagusta, Cyprus. Built between 1298 and c. 1400, it was consecrated as a Catholic cathedral in 1328. The cathedral was converted into a mosque after the Ottoman Empire captured Famagusta in 1571 and it remains a mosque to this day. From 1954 the building has taken its name from Lala Mustafa Pasha, the Grand Vizier of the Ottoman Empire from Sokolovići in Bosnia, who served Murat III and led Ottoman forces against the Venetians in Cyprus.

History

Early history
The French Lusignan dynasty ruled as Kings of Cyprus from 1192 to 1489 and brought with them the latest French taste in architecture, notably developments in Gothic architecture. 

The cathedral was constructed from 1298 to 1312 and was consecrated in 1328. A unique inscription on a buttress beside the south door records the progress of construction in 1311. "After an unfortunate episode when the current bishop embezzled the restoration fund", Bishop Guy of Ibelin bequeathed 20,000 bezants for its construction. The Lusignans would be crowned as Kings of Cyprus in the St. Sophia Cathedral (now Selimiye Mosque) in Nicosia and then crowned as Kings of Jerusalem in the St Nicholas Cathedral in Famagusta.

The building is built in Rayonnant Gothic style, quite rare outside France, though "mediated through buildings in the Rhineland". The historic tie between France and Cyprus is evidenced by its parallels to French archetypes such as Reims Cathedral. Indeed, so strong is the resemblance, that the building has been dubbed "The Reims of Cyprus"; it was built with three doors, twin towers over the aisles and a flat roof, typical of Crusader architecture.

Sometime after 1480, a meeting chamber, known as the Loggia Bembo, was added to the south-west corner of the cathedral. Notable for its elaborately moulded entrance with slender pillars in marble, it is in an architectural style that departs considerably from that of the cathedral proper. The association with the Bembo family, some of whom held prominent positions in Cyprus, is shown by their heraldic devices on the building. To enhance the Loggia, late antique fragments in marble, probably brought from Salamis, were placed as seats each side of the entrance.

Ottoman Era

The upper parts of the cathedral's two towers suffered from earthquakes, were badly damaged during the Ottoman bombardments of 1571, and were never repaired. With the Venetians defeated and Famagusta fallen by August 1571, Cyprus fell under Ottoman control and the cathedral was converted into a mosque, renamed the "St. Sophia Mosque of Mağusa".
 
Nearly all statuary, cruciforms, stained glass, frescos, and paintings were removed or plastered over, as well as most tombs and the altar. The Gothic structure was preserved however, and a few tombs can still be identified in the north aisle.

In 1954, it was renamed the Lala Mustafa Pasha Mosque after the commander of the 1570 Ottoman conquest - infamous for the gruesome torture of Marco Antonio Bragadin, the  Venetian commander of the city's fortress.   Bragadin had surrendered the city following a brutal 10-month siege in which 6,000 Christian defenders held off an army of more than 100,000 Ottoman Turks.

Architectural legacy

The Cathedral of St. Nicholas was not widely emulated as far as can be judged from surviving buildings of the Lusignan period in Cyprus. However, in the nineteenth century the west portal and other details were copied directly in the Greek Orthodox church at Lysi.

Famagusta Cathedral in literature
Famagusta Cathedral appears in several works of literature, including Kuraj by the Italian writer Silvia Di Natale, Sunrise by the British author Victoria Hislop and In Search of Sixpence by the Anglo-Cypriot author Michael Paraskos.

See also
 Rayonnant
 Saint Sophia Cathedral, Nicosia
 Conversion of non-Muslim places of worship into mosques

Gallery

References

External links

 Lala Mustafa Pasha Mosque (St Nicholas Cathedral)
 Cypnet page with sources relating to the Ottoman occupation and invasion plans
 Aerial photograph
 Flickr photograph
 Interior photo of the nave
 Cyprus travel guide
 St Peter and Paul Church (Sinan Pasha Mosque) Famagusta

Buildings and structures completed in 1400
14th-century mosques
Cathedrals in the Turkish Republic of Northern Cyprus
Mosques in the Turkish Republic of Northern Cyprus
Mosques converted from churches in the Ottoman Empire
Gothic architecture in Cyprus
Buildings and structures in Famagusta
Former cathedrals in Cyprus
Burial sites of the House of Lusignan